World Series of Fighting 32: Moraes vs. Hill 2 was a mixed martial arts event held on  at the Xfinity Arena in Everett, Washington, United States.

Background
The event was headlined by a rematch for the WSOF Bantamweight Championship between Marlon Moraes and Josh Hill. 

In the co-main event Alexandre Almeida put up his WSOF Featherweight Championship in a rematch against former champion Lance Palmer.

Results

See also
List of WSOF events
List of WSOF champions

References

World Series of Fighting events
2016 in mixed martial arts